Galactic Republic is a galactic polity, a republic that spans most of a galaxy.

It may refer to:

 Galactic Republic, in Star Wars, the Old Republic, the New Republic
 Galactic Republic, a fictional polity in the 1953 comic book story "Judgment Day", that was controversially a target of censorship in 1956
 Galactic Republic, a fictional polity from the Japanese anime OAV series Legend of Galactic Heroes, see List of Legend of the Galactic Heroes episodes

See also

 List of fictional galactic communities
 Galactic Republic Alliance, a fictional polity from the tokusatsu TV show Ultraman 80, see List of Ultraman 80 characters
 
 Republic (disambiguation)
 Galactic (disambiguation)
 Galactic Alliance (disambiguation)
 Galactic Empire (disambiguation)
 Galactic Federation (disambiguation)